William Bolton was a Scotland international rugby football player.

Rugby Union career

Amateur career

Bolton played for West of Scotland.

International career

He was capped once for Scotland on 6 March 1876.

References

1896 deaths
1851 births
Rugby union players from Stirling
Scottish rugby union players
Scotland international rugby union players
West of Scotland FC players
Rugby union forwards
Oxford University RFC players